Tic Tac Toe may refer to:

Tic-tac-toe, (also known as Noughts and crosses or Xs and Os), a paper-and-pencil game for two players, X and O, who take turns marking the spaces in a 3×3 grid.
Tic Tac Toe (band), all-female German group
Tic Tac Toe (album), self-titled album by above band
"Tic-Tac-Toe", a 1990 single by Kyper
"Tic Tac Toe", a 2019 single by Peakboy, Paul Kim, and Heize

See also
Tic-Tac-Toe Barb, common name used for two species of barbs:
 Puntius ticto, also called the ticto barb or two spot barb, a subtropical brackish or freshwater barb from Southeast Asia.
 Puntius stoliczkanus, a tropical freshwater barb from Southeast Asia.
OXO, video game created by Alexander S. Douglas
For the variants of tic-tac-toe, the game, see Tic-tac-toe variants
Noughts and crosses (disambiguation)